Bartosz Piotr Slisz (born 29 March 1999) is a Polish professional footballer who plays as a midfielder for Legia Warsaw.

Club career
In 2018, he signed for Zagłębie Lubin. On 28 February 2020 he became a footballer of Legia Warsaw. He signed a contract with the Warsaw club until the end of 2024. The team from Warsaw paid 1.8 million euros for the transfer to Zagłębie Lubin, which is a record amount for which a Polish team bought a footballer.

International career
He made his debut for the Poland national football team on 5 September 2021 in a World Cup qualifier against San Marino, a 7–1 away victory. He substituted Jakub Moder at half-time.

Honours
Legia Warsaw
Ekstraklasa: 2019-20, 2020-21

International

References

1999 births
Living people
Polish footballers
People from Rybnik
Association football midfielders
Poland youth international footballers
Poland under-21 international footballers
Poland international footballers
II liga players
Ekstraklasa players
Zagłębie Lubin players
Legia Warsaw players